Vaneeza Ahmad (Punjabi, ; born 24 June 1971) is a Pakistani model and actress, and occasional singer. As a model she has seen success as the face of brands in Pakistan, and is the first Pakistani model to model for  Donna Karan and Calvin Klein.

Biography

Early life
Ahmad reportedly said to news media that when she was a youngster, the college students those days mostly had three career options – medicine, engineering or teaching. Modelling as a career was not an option for girls back then. Ahmad returned to Pakistan at the age of 18 to attend the Kinnaird College liberal arts university in Lahore and graduated with a bachelor's degree in psychology.

While at University, Ahmad started to model casually. Although not much interested in modelling as a career option, she received offers from various fashion designers, some of whom were notable in the Pakistani fashion industry including the likes of fashion designer Nilofer Shahid.

Modelling as a career
When designer Nilofer Shahid approached Ahmad, she was unsure of which career to pursue and settled for fashion modeling. In dealings with corporate heads of the entertainment industry, her business acumen was similarly praised.

Vaneeza, the brand
Ahmad conceived the brand name Vlawn for her range of lawn fabrics. The collection consisted of nine different lawn prints created by designers that included Nomi Ansari, Umar Sayeed and Hassan Sheheryar Yasin. In March 2006, the collection sold-out in a series of exhibitions. In 2011, she continued with her "VLawn" brand of women's lawn suits.

Acting and acclaim
Ahmad made her acting debut in Jamal Shah's controversial saga Kal and has since acted in Marina Khan's Tum Hi Tau Ho, Janey Anjaney and Tum Say Mil Ker; Armaan; Khayal; and Talaash (Pakistani TV series). She played the founder of Pakistan Muhammad Ali Jinnah's daughter Dina Wadia in Jamil Dehlavi's 1998 biographical film, Jinnah.

On 16 April 2008, Vaneeza Ahmad was selected as one of the Olympic torch bearers when the torch arrived in Islamabad. She was one of the few selected celebrities to hold the torch in the relay out of the chosen 66.

Personal life
She married Islamabad-based businessman Ali Afzal Malik in July 2010 and has two daughters. She also runs her own side business.

Filmography

Films

Television

TV commercials 

 (1996) | "Aisa Asar Dekhai Ke Bahar Bhi Dhoke Khai | Tibet Snow
 (1997) | "Kyun Ke Yeh Dil Ka Mamla Hai" | Habib Oil 
Sab Say Ghara Doodh | Haleeb Milk
Pepsi Diet | Pepsi
Head & Shoulders
 (2001) | "Express Yourself" | Instaphone 
 Lipton by Unilever
 (2006) | "Ramzan Mubarak" | Olpers 
 (2006) | "50 Years" | LUX by Unilever 
 (2007) | Brings People Closer | Indigo by Jazz Pakistan 
 (2007) | Subah Bakhair Zindagi | Olpers 
 (2008) Sunsilk by Unilever
 (2009) Dettol 
 (2010) | "Ghee" | Kissan Oil
 (2011) | "Prints" | V Lawn 
 (2016) | "Ghizayat Bhara Har Ghoont" | Olpers 
 (2020) | "Khulay To Dil Khulay" | Coca-Cola

Other appearances

Reality Shows

Music videos

Accolades

See also 
 List of Pakistani models
 List of Pakistani actresses

References

External links
 

1971 births
Pakistani female models
Pakistani film actresses
Living people
Punjabi people
Pakistani expatriates in Germany
Kinnaird College for Women University alumni
Actresses from Lahore
20th-century Pakistani actresses
21st-century Pakistani actresses
Pakistani fashion designers
Female models from Punjab, Pakistan
Muslim models
Pakistani women fashion designers
People from Lahore